Thuarea is a genus of plants in the grass family, native to Asia, Africa, Australia, and various islands of the Indian and Pacific Oceans.

Species:
 Thuarea involuta (G.Forst.) R.Br. ex Sm. - Madagascar, China, Japan (incl Bonin, Volcano, Ryukyu Is), Bangladesh, Sri Lanka, Indian Islands (Andaman, Nicobar, Laccadive), Thailand, Vietnam, Cambodia, Malaysia, Indonesia, Philippines, Papuasia, Queensland, Northern Territory, Melanesia, Micronesia, Hawaii.
 Thuarea perrieri A.Camus - Madagascar

References

Panicoideae
Poaceae genera